General Édouard Corniglion-Molinier (23 January 1898, in Nice, Alpes-Maritimes – 9 May 1963) was an aviator and member of the French Resistance, a member of the French government during the French Fourth Republic, and, in the 1930-1940s, a movie producer (André Malraux's L'Espoir also known as Man's Hope). He was a friend of Marcel Dassault and a cousin of Fred Vidal.

Producer 
 1936 : :fr:Les Jumeaux de Brighton directed by Claude Heymann
 Southern Mail (1937)
 1937 : :fr:Drôle de drame by Marcel Carné
 1938 : Mollenard by Robert Siodmak
 1945 : :fr:Espoir, sierra de Teruel by André Malraux

References

External links 
 

1898 births
1963 deaths
People from Nice
Politicians from Provence-Alpes-Côte d'Azur
Rally of the French People politicians
National Centre of Social Republicans politicians
Union for the New Republic politicians
French Ministers of Justice
Transport ministers of France
French Ministers of Tourism
French Senators of the Fourth Republic
Senators of Seine (department)
Deputies of the 2nd National Assembly of the French Fourth Republic
Deputies of the 3rd National Assembly of the French Fourth Republic
Deputies of the 2nd National Assembly of the French Fifth Republic
French aviators
French Resistance members
French people of the Algerian War
Companions of the Liberation